Outside Looking In may refer to:

 Outside Looking In (album), by the BoDeans
 "Outside Looking In" (song), the debut single by Jordan Pruitt
 Outside Looking In (play), 1925 Broadway play by Maxwell Anderson
 Outside Looking In: The Best of the Gin Blossoms, a 1999 compilation
 Outside Looking In, an album by Dave Hole
 "Outside Looking In", a song by Bruce Springsteen from his 2010 album The Promise
 Outside Looking In (novel), by T. C. Boyle

See also 
Inside Looking Out (disambiguation)
Outside In (disambiguation)